Black Mask is a 1996 Hong Kong action superhero film starring Jet Li, Lau Ching-wan, Karen Mok and Anthony Wong. It was directed by Daniel Lee and produced by Tsui Hark and his production company Film Workshop. In 1999, the film was dubbed in English and released in the US by Artisan Entertainment.

The film is an adaptation of the 1992 manhua Black Mask by Li Chi-Tak. In 2002, it was followed by a sequel, Black Mask 2: City of Masks starring Andy On.

In homage to The Green Hornet, Black Mask wears a domino mask and chauffeur's cap in the same style as Kato (played by Bruce Lee) from the television series. The Black Mask is even compared to Kato in a news reporter scene.

Plot 
Tsui Chik (or Simon in the US version) tries to lead a quiet life as a librarian. However, he is really a former test subject for a highly secretive supersoldier project and the instructor of a special commando unit dubbed "701". The 701 squad is used for many government missions, but after one of the agents kills a team of policemen in an uncontrollable rage, the government decides to abort the project and eliminate all the subjects. Tsui Chik helped the surviving 701 agents flee the extermination attempt. Having escaped, Tsui Chik went separate ways from his team and lived in Hong Kong. Later at night he discovers that the rest of the team were responsible for a violent crime spree that was beyond the capability of the local police. He sets out to get rid of them, donning a mask and hat using the superhero alias of The Black Mask. Having lost the ability to feel pain due to the surgery performed on the super-soldiers by the military, Black Mask is almost invulnerable.

Cast 
 Jet Li as Tsui Chik / Black Mask
 Lau Ching-wan as Inspector Shek Wai-Ho
 Karen Mok as Tracy Lee
 Françoise Yip as Yeuk-Lan
 Patrick Lung as Commander Hung Kuk
 Anthony Wong as King Kau
 Xiong Xin-xin as Jimmy
 Moses Chan as 701 Squad Member
 Henry Fong Ping as Ricky Tai
 Shut Mei-yee as Chief of Library
 Szeto Wai-cheuk as Szeto
 Chung King-fai as Commissioner of Police
 Ken Lok as Sergeant Crap
 Lawrence Ah Mon as Operating Room Doctor
Dion Lam as Sour
 Mike Ian Lambert as 701 Squad Member

Release 
Released on 9 November 1996, Black Mask grossed a moderate HK$13,286,788 during its Hong Kong box office run.

In May 1999, home video distributor Artisan Entertainment released a re-edited version in the United States theatrically. It grossed a reasonable US$4,449,692 ($4,545 per screen) in its opening weekend, and grossed a total of US$12,504,289.

DVD sales for Black Mask totalled  in North America and more than  worldwide. Lionsgate Home Entertainment (successor to Artisan when it acquired in 2003) released a Blu-ray version in the United States on 2 September 2008.

Alternate versions 
The film is recognised for having multiple versions: Hong Kong (Cantonese), Taiwanese (Mandarin), English (export), United Kingdom (distributed by BMG) and United States (distributed by Artisan Entertainment).

Hong Kong/Taiwanese versions 
For the Cantonese version, the original Mei Ah DVD is cut for gore, but the remastered DVD restores a scene of blood-spurting. The French DVD features the Hong Kong version in the correct form, but contains no English subtitles.

Featured on DVDs distributed in Taiwan by Long Shong, Ritek and Thundermedia, there is approximately 100 seconds footage exclusive to the Taiwanese version:

 Extended dialogue between Tracy and other library staff where they discuss what she would do with Tsui Chik if they cohabited.
 An entire scene where King Kau and a woman are together – he watches her dance, proceeds to have sex and then excitedly shoots her with a water gun and smashes a light.
 An exchange of gestures between Inspector Shek and King Kau.
 King Kau saluting Inspector Shek in an exasperated form.
 A member of the 701 squad impaling himself onto metal sticks and spitting blood. Shortly after trying to retaliate and getting swiftly defeated, Black Mask entangles the metal sticks (whilst still in his body).
 Shots of bullet-impacting when Black Mask shoots the 701 thugs to save Tracy.
 A shot of a bullet hitting the arm of a 701 thug whilst choking Tracy.
 During the hospital sequence, a scene where a 701 thug grabs two cops arms and breaks them.
 The thug smashes a cop's head with his hands.
 More footage of the thug getting shot by police.
 A shot of Yeuk Lan's shoulder being shot with blood shooting out.
 Some more bullet hits on masked cops when the other zombie grabs his gun.
 Inspector Shek removes a severed thug's arm that had been clutching onto his shoulder.
 Shots of Black Mask bleeding after being stabbed.
 More footage of Tracy obtaining a blood bag.
 A shot of Black Mask's blood after being stabbed with a pipe tube.

Both Hong Kong and Taiwanese releases maintain the green-tinting of the film.

English versions 
An English version similar to the Hong Kong version was produced for export (featured on the Spanish DVD), but BMG and Artisan decided to make their own. Whilst only occasionally replacing music on the UK release, Artisan commissioned a brand-new English Hip Hop soundtrack – therefore, removing any reference to the original (despite using excerpts from it in their trailers). Despite a tendency of trimming non-action scenes, the Artisan and BMG versions not only contain all gory content, but also some non-violent scenes not found in any other version:

 Tsui Chik looking for Inspector Shek.
 A few shots of Black Mask's hide-out.
 Inspector Shek advising Yeuk Lan to seek Tsui Chik.

Reception 
Lawrence Van Gelder of The New York Times called it "long on flying bodies, bullets and blood and short on credibility". Marc Savlov of The Austin Chronicle rated it 3/5 stars and called it "a bloodily exhilarating piece of hyper-kinetic filmmaking". Nathan Rabin of The A.V. Club wrote, "While never reaching the manic highs of Chan's best work, Black Mask is an exciting, lightning-fast introduction to one of Hong Kong's biggest and most charismatic stars."

References

External links 
 
 
 
 

1996 films
1990s action films
1996 martial arts films
1990s superhero films
Hong Kong action films
Hong Kong martial arts films
Hong Kong superhero films
Martial arts science fiction films
1990s Cantonese-language films
China Star Entertainment Group films
Films directed by Daniel Lee
Films based on Hong Kong comics
Films set in Hong Kong
Films shot in Hong Kong
Live-action films based on comics
1990s Hong Kong films